= Region XII =

Region XII or Region 12 in Roman numerals, may refer to:

- Magallanes and Antartica Chilena Region, Chile
- Soccsksargen, Philippines
